Dumnui's bent-toed gecko (Cyrtodactylus dumnuii) is a species of lizard in the family Gekkonidae. The species is endemic to Thailand.

Etymology
The specific name, dumnuii, is in honor of Thai zoologist Sophon Dumnui.

Geographic range
C. dumnuii is only know from its type locality, Phabartmaejon Cave in Mae Na, in Chiang Mai Province, Thailand

Habitat
The preferred natural habitats of C. dumnuii are forest and dry caves. The holotype and paratype specimens of C. dumnuii were collected inside the entrance and up to  into a limestone cave.

Description
Adult males of C. dumnuii measure  in snout-to-vent length (SVL), and adult females  SVL.

Reproduction
The mode of reproduction of C. dumnuii is unknown.

References

Cyrtodactylus
Geckos of Thailand
Endemic fauna of Thailand
Reptiles described in 2010